Mohammed Attiyah (born 15 June 1992) is a Saudi Arabian football player who plays as an attacking midfielder for Al-Ain.

Career
Attiyah began his career at the youth teams of hometown club Al-Majd. On 12 July 2012, Attiyah joined Pro League side Najran where he spent one season at. In July 2013, Attiyah joined Abha and spent two seasons at the club before leaving. On 4 September 2015, Attiyah joined Al-Shoulla. On 17 June 2017, Attiyah joined newly promoted Pro League side Ohod. On 3 March 2019, Attiyah signed a pre-contract agreement with Al-Shabab. On July 1, 2019, his contract with Ohod expired, and he formally joined the team. On 26 September 2020, Attiyah joined Damac on loan. On 1 August 2021, Attiyah joined Al-Tai on loan. On 21 August 2022, Attiyah joined Al-Ain on a free transfer.

References

External links
 

1992 births
Living people
Saudi Arabian footballers
People from Medina Province (Saudi Arabia)
Al-Majd Club players
Abha Club players
Najran SC players
Al-Shoulla FC players
Ohod Club players
Al-Shabab FC (Riyadh) players
Damac FC players
Al-Tai FC players
Al-Ain FC (Saudi Arabia) players
Saudi First Division League players
Saudi Professional League players
Association football midfielders